Brandon Jackson Storm (born May 14, 1976) is an American attorney and politician serving as a member of the Kentucky Senate from the 21st district. Elected in November 2020, he assumed office on January 1, 2021.

Early life and education 
Storm is a native of Laurel County, Kentucky. He earned a Bachelor of Science degree in police administration from Eastern Kentucky University in 2000 and a Juris Doctor from the Mississippi College School of Law in 2003.

Career 
Storm worked in independent law firms before founding his own in 2009. He was elected to the Kentucky Senate in November 2020 and assumed office on January 1, 2021. He also serves as vice chair of the Senate Transportation Committee and chair of the Senate Enrollment Committee.

References 

Living people
1976 births
People from London, Kentucky
People from Laurel County, Kentucky
Kentucky lawyers
Republican Party Kentucky state senators
Eastern Kentucky University alumni
Mississippi College School of Law alumni